Menino Jesus ("child Jesus") is a bairro in the District of Sede in the municipality of Santa Maria, in the Brazilian state of Rio Grande do Sul. It is located in northeast Santa Maria.

Villages 
The bairro contains the following villages: Menino Jesus, Vila Leste, Vila Major Duarte, Vila Ponte Seca.

Gallery of photos

References 

Bairros of Santa Maria, Rio Grande do Sul